Tõlli may refer to several places in Estonia:

Tõlli, Pärnu County, village in Tõstamaa Parish, Pärnu County
Tõlli, Saare County, village in Kaarma Parish, Saare County

See also
Tolli, village in Märjamaa Parish, Rapla County